The 2014 Salford City Council election took place on 22 May 2014 to elect members of Salford City Council in England. This was on the same day as other local elections.

The composition of the Council following the 2014 elections:

Ward results
Asterisks denote incumbent Councillors seeking re-election.

Barton ward

Boothstown & Ellenbrook ward

Broughton ward

Cadishead ward

Claremont ward

Eccles ward

Irlam ward

Irwell Riverside ward

Kersal ward

Langworthy ward

Little Hulton ward

Ordsall ward

Pendlebury ward

Swinton North ward

Swinton South ward

Walkden North ward

Walkden South ward

Weaste & Seedley ward

Winton ward

Worsley ward

References

2014 English local elections
2014
2010s in Greater Manchester